The 2013 Campeonato Estadual da Serie A de Profissionais do Rio de Janeiro was the 112th season of the top tier  football of FFERJ (Federação de Futebol do Estado do Rio de Janeiro, or Rio de Janeiro State Football Federation). The competition began on 19 January and ended on 19 May. Botafogo won.

Format
The sixteen clubs were divided into two groups that played in two tournaments. In the first tournament, the Taça Guanabara, the teams played a match with each teams in the other group in a single round-robin format. The two best teams from each group advanced to the playoffs. In the second tournament, the Taça Rio, the teams from one group will played within their group in a single round-robin tournament. The two best teams from each group advanced to the playoffs. The winner of both the Taça Guanabara and Taça Rio played for the state championship. If the same team won both tournament, they were automatically declared the champion.

Qualifications
The best four teams not qualified to 2014 Copa Libertadores qualified for 2014 Copa do Brasil. The best team not playing in Campeonato Brasileiro Série A, B, or C qualified for 2013 Campeonato Brasileiro Série D

Participating teams

First phase (Taça Guanabara)
The 2013 Taça Guanabara began on January 19 and ended on March 10.

Group stage

Final stage

Second phase (Taça Rio)
The 2013 Taça Rio began on March and ended in May.

Group stage

Final stage

Torneio Super Clássicos  
The Torneio Super Clássicos concerned all regular games between the four "big" clubs: Botafogo, Flamengo, Fluminense and Vasco da Gama.

3rd round

4th round

6th round

7th round

12th round

14th round

Overall table

External links
2013 Campeonato Carioca at Soccerway

Campeonato Carioca seasons
Carioca